Big Jack may refer to:

Arts and entertainment
 Big Jack (film), a 1949 film
 "Big Jack" (song), by Australian hard rock band AC/DC
 "The Big Jack", a track on the 1994 album Dance Naked by John Mellencamp
 Big Jack, an African-American action figure in the Big Jim (toy line)

People
 Jack Arkwright (1902–1990), English rugby league footballer
 Big Jack Armstrong, American DJ born John Charles Larsh in 1945
 Big Jack Johnson (1939 or 1940–2011), American blues musician
 Jack McGill (ice hockey, born 1921) (1921–1994), Canadian hockey player
 John J. McNulty Jr. (1922–2009), American politician
 Alistair Nicholson ((born 1978), former Australian rules footballer
 Jack Pioggi, American saloon keeper and underworld figure in New York City
 Jack Wisner (1899–1981), American Major League Baseball pitcher
 Big Jack Zelig (1888–1912), New York gangster

Other uses
 nickname of the Union Pacific EMD DDA40X locomotive
 Big Jack Lake - see List of lakes in Woodruff County, Arkansas
 "Big Jack" burger sold by Hungry Jack's

See also
Big Jacks Creek
Big Jacks Creek Wilderness
Big Jake

Lists of people by nickname